The Republican Left Democratic Front (RiDaLoS) was a coalition of political parties in the Indian state of Maharashtra formed before the 2009 Maharashtra state assembly elections, in Maharashtra. The alliance was forged between 14 political parties and many other NGOs and non political groups as well as students organisations  in Maharashtra Republican Left Democratic Front Popularly known as RIDALOS  as an alternative to the existing coalitions in the state.

Formation 
In the weeks leading up to the 2009 Maharashtra Assembly election, RPI leader Ramdas Athawale announced the formation of the RIDALOS (RLDF) composing of Republican Party of India (United), Rashtriya Samaj Paksha, 
Communist Party of India (Marxist), Peasants and Workers Party, Janata Dal (Secular), Samajwadi Party, Swabhimani Paksha, Chhatra Bharati and Others. Ridalos contested all 288 Assembly seats against both Congress-NCP and BJP-Shivsena combines. He announced that the RIDALOS would be secular and would champion the cause of the poor and backward sections of the population. RIDALOS main focus was to be on the development of the Scheduled Castes, Dalits, Adivasis, Muslims and farmers. Athavale emphasised that he would not later support Congress or NCP despite his history of allying with them.
Athavale also requested Prakash Ambedkar to join the RIDALOS (Third Front) But, Prakash Ambedkar did not join the Third Front (RIDALOS), Rather he formed Fourth Front composed of Bharipa Bahujan Mahasangh, All India United Democratic Front, Peace Party of India, and few other small organisations.

Meeting 
The first round of meeting was held in Mumbai and then followed with major public rally at Shivaji Park. It was attended by heavy weights political leaders from state as well as from national political parties. Even film stars and cricketers took part in this public rally to attract crowds. Bollywood Star Sanjay Dutt and Cricketer Vinod Kambli was star campaigner of RIDALOS.

Members 
The following were the founding members of this coalition:
RPI(U)
LDF

CPI(M)
CPI
PWP
SCP

 Lok Bharati
JD(S)
SP
RJD
LJSP
RSP
SJP
 Socialist Front
 Swabhimani Paksha
 Chhatra Bharati

Prominent Leaders 
The following are the Leaders of this RIDALOS coalition

 Ramdas Athawale
 Mahadev Jankar 
 Jogendra Kawade
 Prakash Karat
 Mulayam Singh Yadav
 Kapil Patil
 Lalu Prasad Yadav
 Jayant Patil
 Abu Azmi
 Vinod Kambli
 Raju Shetti
 Ram Vilas Paswan

Result 
RIDALOS didn't receive much success as expected but became the third largest coalition after congress-NCP and Shivsena-BJP, while Maharashtra Navnirman Sena became fourth largest coalition with winning 13 assembly seats.
While Fourth Front led by Prakash Ambedkar got only 2 seats.

See also 
 2009 Maharashtra state assembly elections
 State Assembly elections in India, 2009
 Democratic Front (India)

References

Defunct socialist parties in India
Defunct political parties in Maharashtra
Political parties established in 2009
Coalition governments of India
Defunct political party alliances in India
Republican Party of India
Dalit politics
2009 establishments in Maharashtra